The Deer's Cry is a sacred motet by Arvo Pärt, set to text from a traditional Irish lorica for a four-part choir a cappella. He composed the piece on a commission from the Irish Louth Contemporary Music Society. It was published by Universal Edition in 2007 and  first performed in Louth, Ireland, in February 2008.

History 
The work was commissioned by the Louth Contemporary Music Society. The text is the final part of a traditional prayer for protection, Saint Patrick's Breastplate, attributed to St. Patrick, the primary patron saint of Ireland. The text is known as "The Deer's Cry", "The Breastplate of St Patrick", or "Lorica" and is often attributed to the saint. Pärt wrote his setting in modern English, beginning with "Christ with me", composed for a four-part choir a cappella. It was published by Universal Edition in 2007, and was first performed by the State Choir Latvija, conducted by Fergus Sheil, in Louth on 13 February 2008. The Deer's Cry is in one movement and takes about five minutes to perform.

Text 
Pärt set an excerpt of the prayer, its conclusion, and repeating the first line of that section ("Christ with me") in the end:

Music 
The music is in A minor, consisting of slow, marked quarter notes at 72 per minute. The measures contain different even numbers, from two, often used for general rests, to eight. The lower voices begin with divided altos and basses, which sing "Christ is with me" four times in homophony with long rests in between. While they keep that pattern, the sopranos enter in the seventh measure to deliver the following text. From measure 17, the lower voices also take part in the text, singing "Christ in me". They are often juxtaposed to the sopranos, such as with "arise" vs. "sit down". A climax is reached in measure 33 when all the voices sing in homophony, and every one divided: "Christ in the heart ...". After the text is completed, followed by a general rest, all voices sing, similarly to the beginning: "Christ with me", once softly, finally very soft and diminishing.

Performance and recording 
In 2016, the Sixteen choir named a program of music by William Byrd and Pärt The Deer's Cry, which they performed in several venues and recorded on the CORO label. A collection of choral music by Pärt by the Estonian vocal group Vox Clamantis, conducted by Jaan-Eik Tulve, was performed under the same name. A reviewer notes the pure intonation required for the spiritual purity of the music. The British octet Voces8 released a recording in 2019 on their album After Silence I: Remembrance.

References

External links 
 

Compositions by Arvo Pärt
2007 compositions
Choral compositions
Contemporary classical compositions
Contemporary Christian songs